Head of a Woman may refer to:

Head of a Woman (Bosch), a Hieronymus Bosch painting fragment.
Head of a Woman (Leonardo da Vinci), painted around 1500
Head of a Woman (Delacroix), 1823
Head of a Woman (Fernande Olivier) by Pablo Picasso, 1909

See also 
Woman's Head